is a Japanese female curler.

At the national level she is a 2018 Japan women's champion.

Teams

Personal life
Her younger sister Arisa is also a curler. They played together at the 2018 World Women's Curling Championship.

References

External links

Yuna Kotani - Curling World Cup player profile

Living people
1998 births
People from Sagamihara
Japanese female curlers
Japanese curling champions
20th-century Japanese women
21st-century Japanese women